Axel Christian Zetlitz Sømme (19 April 1899 – 14 July 1991) was a Norwegian educator, economist and geographer. During the 1920s, he was a political activist, magazine editor and newspaper editor.

Biography
He was born in Stavanger, Norway.  His parents were Andreas Sømme (1849-1937) and Maren Sophie Berner (1858-1946). His father was a shipowner who was a grandson of Jacob Kielland (1788–1863), one of the largest merchants in Stavanger. His uncle,  Jacob Kielland Sømme (1862-1950), was a noted artist.

He attended Stavanger Cathedral School graduating in 1917. He received his  cand.philol. at the University of Oslo in 1924. As a student he was politically active in the Mot Dag movement  and edited the magazine Mot Dag in 1921. He was the first editor of the newspaper Rjukan Arbeiderblad. In this position he was sentenced to 30 days imprisonment for publishing articles encouraging the  1924 military strike.

Between 1927-29, he completed secondary studies in economics at Paris  and became Dr. Philos. in  1931 on the basis on his dissertation La Lorraine métallurgique. From 1925-32,   Sømme was a teacher at Oslo Handelsgymnasium and then a lecturer and principal of Genèveskolen in Geneva (Nordisk folkehøyskole i Genève) from 1932-35. He became a lecturer in trade geography when the Norwegian School of Economics in Bergen opened in 1936.  He was appointed professor at the Norwegian School of Economics from 1948 to 1969.

Among his most important scientific works was Jordbrukets geografi i Norge which was published in two volumes (J.W. Eides Forlag, 1949 and 1954).

Personal life
He was married twice. In 1927 he married  Gabrielle  Kielland Holst (1899-1952), the marriage dissolved in 1939.
In 1945, he married Johanne Wilhelmine Barclay Nitter (1904-1999).
Axel  Sømme died during 1991 in Bergen, Norway.

Selected works
Verdensøkonomiens pulsårer, 1931 
Skogen i Norge. Med et tillegg om treforedlingsindustrien, 1932
En norsk 3-årsplan. Veien frem til en socialistisk planøkonomi i Norge (with Ole Colbjørnsen), 1933
Jordbruket i Norge, 1933
Fiskernes vei til bedre kår, 1935
Varer og veier i verdenshandelen i mellomkrigstiden (with Tore Ouren), 1948
Fjellbygd og feriefjell, 1965

References

1899 births
1991 deaths
People from Stavanger
University of Oslo alumni
Norwegian educators
Norwegian economists
Norwegian geographers
Norwegian newspaper editors
Mot Dag
Academic staff of the Norwegian School of Economics
20th-century geographers